Fetoscope may refer to:

the kind of endoscope used in fetoscopy
fibreoptic scope for looking  directly at the fetus, as opposed to a stethoscope used to listen the heart beat
the Pinard horn fetal stethoscope
Doppler ultrasound or Medical ultrasonography "wands"